China Merchants Port Holdings Company Limited is a major conglomerate based in Hong Kong and is involved in a range of businesses such as port operations, general and bulk cargo transportation, container and shipping business, air cargo, logistics park operations and paint products. China Merchants Port is considered as a Red Chip company as the Hong Kong Stock Exchange listing. The company has port facilities in mainland China and Hong Kong, and the predecessor was founded in 1991. The predecessor of the parent company was established in 1872 and was the preeminent industrial and commercial group in mainland China. Before changing its name to China Merchants Port Holdings Company Limited, the company was formerly known as China Merchants Holdings (International) Company Limited.

History
On 28 May 1991, the company's predecessor was founded in Hong Kong.

On 16 June 1997, the company adopted the title China Merchants Holdings (International) Company Limited.

On 15 July 1997, the company was listed in the Hong Kong Stock Exchange.

On 10 August 2016, the company adopted its current title.

Company background 
China Merchants Port's predecessor was founded in Hong Kong on 28 May 1991, and changed to its present name in 1997. Port facilities are located in Hong Kong and Mainland China, such as Shanghai, Tianjin and Qingdao. However, China Merchants Port was truly founded in 1872 as the first merchant company of the Qing dynasty and has experienced a history that stretches from the Republic of China to the official establishment of the People's Republic of China. Port facilities are located in Hong Kong and Mainland China. Its national port network is spread across the Pearl River Delta, Bohai Economic Zone, Xiamen Bay Economic Zone, Yangtze River Delta and Southwest China. This includes the coastal hub ports of Hong Kong, Shanghai, Qingdao and Xiamen Bay.

Besides the operations in Hong Kong and Mainland China, it also operates overseas. Its investments are concentrated in developing countries such as Nigeria and among other African countries, as well as the countries among South Asia, especially in Sri Lanka, the port of Hambantota that located in southern Sri Lanka is one of the biggest foreign investment by China Merchants Port. The company has approximately 130 berths for loading and unloading at wharves and piers worldwide, with a capacity of 60 million containers. It controls more than 30% of the berths in mainland China. The company operates through its port operations, bonded logistics business and other businesses. These include container terminal operations, break-bulk terminals, the operation of logistics parks operated by China Merchants Ports and its associates, including port transportation and airport cargo handling, as well as property development and investment, including the construction of modular buildings and the provision of container terminal services. In addition, China Merchants Port is involved in port development and berth operations, as well as tugboat berthing assistance and barge services when ships arrive in port, cargo handling during loading and unloading, and providing ships with shore power and fresh water.

China Merchants Port is one of three Chinese enterprises named among the top 10 terminal operators in the world; the other two are Hutchison Port Holdings and COSCO Shipping Ports. In the 2018 Lloyd's list of the top 10 global port operators, China Merchants Port was ranked fifth, as of 2018, they have a network of 34 ports in 18 countries around the world, such as Houston in the US and Newcastle in Australia.

Structure of the company 
The majority of the shareholders in China Merchants Port are insiders. The insiders held 65.26% of the shares in the company, as the largest shareholder of the company is China Merchants Group, its parent company, accounting for 43% of the total shares, while China Merchants Technology Holdings Co. Ltd. accounting for 21.9% of the shares. Institutions held 27.87% of the float and 9.68% of the shares. The number of Institutions holding shares is 223.

China Merchants Port has operations in 25 countries, with a network of 41 ports by 2020, including Sri Lanka's Colombo International Container Terminal Limited and Togo's Lomé Container Terminal S.A. The parent company, China Merchants Group, achieved sales of CNY 649.9 billion in 2019. In 2020, the company had total revenue of US$1,147,838,440, with the port business accounting for 93% of the company's revenue and the bonded logistics and other operations accounting for the rest.

China Merchants Port’s Publicly Available Shareholders

Top 6 Mutual Fund Holder

China Merchants Port's Related Companies

Company manager 
Table 1 provides information on the company's major managers, specifying each person's full name and their roles.

Indexed stock
In the quarterly review of Hang Seng Index composition ended on Jun 29 2018, it was announced by Hang Seng Indexes Company that China Merchants Port will be removed from constituent stocks from Sep 10, 2018, and replaced by another. The decision to remove China Merchants Port was due to its turnover volume and market capitalisation failed to meet the minimum requirements.

Foreign Investment 
China Merchants Port invested in 6 terminals in 2005 and increased to 18 by the end of 2017. However, 2009 is the year they start to make overseas investments. As part of China's "Maritime Silk Road" plan, the company has increased its overseas port facility upgrades in recent years. The sea routes, proposed by Chinese Communist Party leader Xi Jinping, aim to connect China to Europe via Southeast Asia and the Middle East. The company has acquired 49% stake in Terminal Link, the combination of Compagnie Maritime d'Affrètement (CMA) and Compagnie Générale Maritime (CGM), as well as the purchase of 90% stock in TCP Participações SA, a container terminal in Brazil in 2017. Besides, the company also engaged with the Sikan Island Container Terminal located in Nigeria, the Multipurpose Port of Doraleh located in Djibouti, Colombo International Container Terminal Limited and the Hambantota Port project in Sri Lanka in relation to China's Belt and Road Initiative. The company is also helping to fund a US$10 billion Tanzanian port in Bagamoyo, Tanzania, promoted by the Tanzanian government.

Eurofos Terminal 
Eurofos Terminal is a container terminal in Fos-sur-Mer, France. China Merchants Port acquired a 49% “advantageous stake” in Terminal Link in 2013, which is the subsidiary of CMA CGM, the name of two predecessor companies combined, Compagnie Maritime d'Affrètement (CMA) and Compagnie Générale Maritime (CGM), the world's third-largest container shipping company in France. Meanwhile, the acquisition from Terminal Link made China Merchants port obtain an approximate 25% share from the only Chinese invested French Mediterranean port in France, the Eurofos terminal in Marseille.

Malta Freeport Terminal 

Malta Freeport Terminal is a transit hub located in the heart of the Mediterranean. After the Malta Freeport in Marsaxlokk, Malta's container port was franchised to the French shipping company, CMA CGM, at least until the year 2038. When China Merchants Ports acquired a 49% stake in Terminal Link in 2013, it then obtained an approximate 25% stake in Malta Freeport Terminal while CMA CGM held the rest of the shares (51%).

Port of Colombo 

The Port of Colombo is the largest port located in the southwestern shores on the Kelani River of Sri Lanka. China Merchants Port has held a groundbreaking ceremony at the Port of Colombo in Sri Lanka in 2014 as the new container terminal has launched there. This is one of the largest foreign investments in the country, with a total value of more than US$500 million.

Port of Hambantota 
The Hambantota International Port is a port in southern Sri Lanka, is located a few hundred kilometres off the coast of India, on a vital economic and military waterway. Construction and investment in the port have come from China, which first signed a US$1.3 billion agreement for the Hambantota port project in 2007, with financing from China Exim Bank and China Merchants Port, while China Harbour Engineering Corporation (CHEC) is responsible for the construction of the port.

With the Port of Hambantota's expansion, China Merchants Port Holdings has become the major shareholder of the Hambantota Port. Sirisena, a member of the Parliament of Sri Lanka, negotiates with China Merchants Port and sells the government's majority stake in the terminal company. They signed an agreement with The Sri Lanka Port Authority in 2017 in which China Merchants Port leased the Port of Hambantota for operation for 99 years. At the same time, China Merchants Port purchase a 70% stake of the Hambantota Port from Sri Lankan government for $1.1 billion in July 2017, including the 42-hectares artificial island located at the port opening.

TCP Participações SA 
TCP Participações SA is a container terminal in Brazil. A quarter of the company's containerised exports and imports depart or arrive in China. In 2017, China Merchants Port agreed to purchase 90% stock in TCP Participações SA for US$935 million and increase its annual container throughput “from 1.5 million TEUs to 2.5 million TEUs”.

China Merchants Port's acquisition of the port business by year

References

External links
China Merchants Holdings International official website

Companies listed on the Hong Kong Stock Exchange
Former companies in the Hang Seng Index
Government-owned companies of China
Port operating companies
China Merchants
Shipping companies of Hong Kong